Madan-e Surameh (also Romanized as Ma‘dan-e Sūrameh) is a village in Dehram Rural District, Dehram District, Farashband County, Fars Province, Iran. At the 2006 census, its population was 26, in 9 families.

References 

Populated places in Farashband County